Fomenkov is a Russian masculine surname, its feminine counterpart is Fomenkova. It may refer to
Alexey Fomenkov (born 1991), Russian paralympic swimmer 
Valeri Fomenkov (1938–2021), Russian ice hockey player

See also
Fomenko

Russian-language surnames